Arredondo is a surname of Spanish origin. Notable people with the surname include:

Arts and entertainment
 Héctor Arredondo (1970–2014), Mexican actor
 Inés Arredondo (1928–1989), Mexican writer
 Isidoro Arredondo (1655–1702), Spanish painter
 Maria Arredondo (born 1985), Norwegian pop singer
 Ricardo Arredondo (painter) (1850–1911), Spanish painter
 Samuel Arredondo (born 2002), Korean-Mexican pop singer

Politics and military
 Arcelia Arredondo García (born 1957), Mexican politician
 Avelino Arredondo, 19th century Uruguayan assassin
 Ben Arredondo, American politician
 Carlos Arredondo, American anti-war activist
 Jesús Arredondo Velázquez (born 1964), Mexican politician
 José Joaquín de Arredondo (1768–1837), Spanish-Mexican soldier
 Nicolás Antonio de Arredondo (1726–1802), Spanish soldier and politician, fourth viceroy of Río de la Plata
 Manuel Arredondo y Pelegrín (1738–1822), Spanish judge, soldier and colonial administrator in Peru and Ecuador
 Salvador Arredondo Ibarra (born 1948), Mexican politician
 Sergio Arredondo (died 2018), Chilean death squad leader
 Victor A. Arredondo, Mexican politician

Sport
 Édgar Arredondo (born 1997), Mexican baseball player
 Eduardo Arredondo (born 1984), Mexican baseball player
 José Arredondo (born 1984), Dominican baseball pitcher
 Rojelio Arredondo (born 1950), American sport shooter
 Julián Arredondo (born 1988), Colombian cyclist
 Luis Arredondo (born 1952), Mexican judoka
 Nicolás Arredondo (boxer) (1950–1987), Mexican boxer
 René Arredondo (judoka) (born 1944), Mexican judoka
 René Arredondo (boxer) (born 1961), Mexican boxer, brother of Ricardo Arredondo (boxer) and Roberto Arredondo
 Ricardo Arredondo (boxer) (1949–1991), Mexican boxer, brother of René Arredondo (boxer) and Roberto Arredondo
 Valentín Arredondo (born 1989), Mexican footballer

Other
 Alberto Arredondo (1912–1968), Cuban journalist and economist
 Oscar Arredondo (1918–2001), Cuban paleontologist and ornithologist
 Patricia Arrendondo (born 1945), Mexican-American counseling psychologist
 Pedro "Pete" Arredondo, chief of the Uvalde Consolidated Independent School District Police Department, 2020–2022

Spanish-language surnames